Swaminarayan Akshardham is a Hindu temple, and spiritual-cultural campus in Delhi, India. The temple is close to the border with Noida. Also referred to as Akshardham Temple or Akshardham Delhi, the complex displays millennia of traditional and modern Hindu culture, spirituality, and architecture. Inspired by Yogiji Maharaj and created by Pramukh Swami Maharaj, it was constructed by BAPS.

The temple was officially opened on 6 November 2005 by Pramukh Swami Maharaj in the presence of Dr. A. P. J. Abdul Kalam, Manmohan Singh, L.K Advani and B.L Joshi. The temple, at the centre of the complex, was built according to the Vastu shastra and Pancharatra shastra.

In Swaminarayan Akshardham, similar to its predecessor Swaminarayan Akshardham in Gandhinagar, Gujarat, the main shrine is the focal point and maintains the central position of the entire complex. There are various exhibition halls which provide information about the life and work of Swaminarayan. The designers of the complex have adopted contemporary modes of communication and technology to create the various exhibition halls.

The complex features an abhishek mandap, Sahaj Anand water show, a thematic garden, and three exhibitions namely Sahajanand Darshan (Hall of Values), Neelkanth Darshan (an IMAX film on the early life of Swaminarayan as the teenage yogi, Neelkanth), and Sanskruti Darshan (cultural boat ride). According to Swaminarayan Hinduism, the word Akshardham means the abode of Swaminarayan and believed by followers as a temporal home of God on earth.

Features

Akshardham Mandir
The main attraction of the Swaminarayan Akshardham complex is the Akshardham Mandir. It is intricately carved with flora, fauna, dancers, musicians, and deities.

The Akshardham Mandir was designed by BAPS Swamis and Virendra Trivedi, a member of the Sompura family. It is entirely constructed from Rajasthani pink sandstone and Italian Carrara marble. Based on traditional Hindu architectural guidelines (Shilpa shastras) on maximum temple life span, it makes no use of ferrous metal. Thus, it has no support from steel or concrete.

The mandir also consists of 234 ornately carved pillars, nine domes, and 20,000 murtis of swamis, devotees, and acharyas. The mandir also features the Gajendra Pith at its base, a plinth paying tribute to the elephant for its importance in Hindu culture and India's history. It contains 148 life sized elephants in total weighing a total of 3000 tons.

Under the temple's central dome lies the 11-foot (3.4m) high murti of Swaminarayan seated in abhayamudra to whom the temple is dedicated. Swaminarayan is surrounded by images of the faith's lineage of Gurus depicted either in a devotional posture or in a posture of service. Each murti is made of paanch dhaatu or five metals in accordance to Hindu tradition. The temple also houses the murtis of Sita Ram, Radha Krishna, Shiv Parvati, and Lakshmi Narayan.

Exhibits

Sahajanand Darshan [Hall of Values]
The Hall of Values features lifelike robotics and dioramas which display incidents from Swaminarayan's life, portraying his message about the importance of peace, harmony, humility, service to others and devotion to God. Set in 18th century India, the audience experiences eternal messages gleaned from ancient Hindu culture such as non‐violence, vegetarianism, perseverance, prayers, morality, and family harmony through 15 3-dimensional dioramas which make use of state of the art robotics, fibre optics, light and sound effects, dialogues, and music. The hall also features the world's smallest animatronic robot in the form of Ghanshyam Maharaj, the child form of Swaminarayan.

Nilkanth Darshan [Theatre]
The theatre shows a 40-minute film specially commissioned for the complex, Neelkanth Yatra, to recount a seven-year pilgrimage made by Swaminarayan made during his teenage years throughout India. Mystic India, an international version of the film produced by BAPS Charities, was released in 2005 at IMAX theatres and giant screen cinemas worldwide.

Sanskruti Vihar [Boat Ride]
The Boat Ride is a 12-minute journey through 10,000 years glorious heritage, using life size figures and robotics to depict life in Vedic India, from family life to bazaars and teaching. It also shows the contributions of Vedic Indians to various fields such as science, astronomy, arts, literature, yoga, mathematics, etc. by eminent persons like mathematician-astronomers Aryabhata and Brahmagupta, grammarian Pāṇini, contributors to the ancient art and science of Ayurveda like Sushruta and Charaka, Classical Sanskrit writer Kālidāsa, philosopher, economist and royal advisor Chanakya, among others. It shows the world's first university, Takshashila and the subjects taught there such as horse riding and warfare. It moves on to the Middle Ages to Sufi saints like Kabir and saints from the Bhakti movement such as Meera and Ramananda and then to recent times highlighting the contributions of modern Indian mathematicians such as Jagadish Chandra Bose, Srinivasa Ramanujan, C. V. Raman and Satyendra Nath Bose and philosophers like Swami Vivekananda.

Musical fountain
Musical fountain, also known as the Yagnapurush Kund, is India's largest step well. It features a very large series of steps down to a traditional 'yagna kund'. During the day, these steps provide rest for the visitors to the complex and at night, a musical fountain show named Sahaj Anand - Multi-Media Water Show is shown. Sahaj Anand Water Show is a 24-minute presentation which unites a variety of media to bring to life a story from the Kena Upanishad. Multi-color lasers, video projections, underwater flames, water jets and surround sound in symphony with lights and live actors produce a presentation. International experts contributed their expertise with BAPS volunteers and swamis to produce this presentation.
 The fountain is named after the founder of the Hindu organization BAPS, Shastriji Maharaj. In its centre lies an eight-petaled lotus-shaped yagna kund designed according to the Jayaakhya Samhita of the Pancharatra shastra.

Garden of India
Also known as the Bharat Upavan, this garden has lush manicured lawns, trees, and shrubs. The garden is lined with bronze sculptures of contributors to India's culture and history. These sculptures include children, women, national figures, freedom fighters, and warriors of India, including notable figures such as Mahatma Gandhi.

Travel

The complex is accessible by Delhi Metro. The Akshardham Metro Station is proximate to the complex.

Additional features

Yogi Hraday Kamal
A sunken gardinene, shaped like a lotus when viewed from above, features large stones engraved with quotes from world luminaries ranging from Shakespeare and Martin Luther King Jr. to Swami Vivekananda and Swaminarayan.

Nilkanth Abhishek
Devotees offer abhishek, a ritual of pouring water on to the murti of Nilkanth Varni, and express their reverence and prayers for spiritual upliftment and fulfilment of wishes.

Narayan Sarovar
The Narayan Sarovar is a lake that surrounds the main monument. The lake contains holy waters from 151 rivers and lakes that are believed to have been sanctified by Swaminarayan, including Mansarovar. Surrounding the Narayan Sarovar are 108 gaumukhs, symbolising Janmangal Namavali or the 108 names for god, from which holy water issues forth.

Premvati Ahargruh
The Premvati Ahargruh/the Premvati Food Court is a vegetarian restaurant modelled on the Ajanta and Ellora caves in Maharashtra, India and an Ayurvedic bazaar. The restaurant caters a variety of traditional dishes.

AARSH Centre
The Akshardham Centre for Applied Research in Social Harmony or the AARSH Centre is a centre within the complex that applies research of social harmony and related topics. Scholars and students may conduct practical research through AARSH. Researchers have the ability to carry out their research projects and affiliate their papers with AARSH. Studies on education, medicare, tribal and rural welfare, ecology, and culture are conducted within the centre.

Planning and development

Planning
The building had been planned since 1968 as a vision of Yogiji Maharaj. Yogiji Maharaj, the spiritual head of the BAPS Swaminarayan Sanstha at the time, expressed his desire for wanting a grand temple built on the banks of the Yamuna river to two or three devotee families of Swaminarayan that resided in New Delhi at the time. Attempts were made to start the project, however little progress was made. In 1971, Yogiji Maharaj died.

In 1982, Pramukh Swami Maharaj, Yogiji Maharaj's successor as the spiritual head of BAPS, started to continue fulfilling the dream of his guru Yogiji Maharaj and prompted devotees to look into the possibility of building the temple in Delhi. A request for the plan was put forward to the Delhi Development Authority (DDA), and several different places were suggested, including Ghaziabad, Gurgaon, and Faridabad. Pramukh Swami Maharaj stood firm in following the wishes of Yogiji Maharaj to build a temple on the Yamuna.

In April 2000, after 18 years, the Delhi Development Authority offered  of land, and the Uttar Pradesh Government offered  for the project. Upon receiving the land, Pramukh Swami Maharaj performed puja on the site for success in the project. Construction on the temple began on 8 November 2000 and Akshardham was officially opened on 6 November 2005, with the building being completed in two days short of five years.

Environmental clearance
An amendment to the Government of India's Environment Impact Assessment Notification of 1994 was made in 2004, which required that environmental clearance be granted to any parcel of land that falls under the Yamuna floodplain before beginning any construction activities. Since Akshardham commenced construction activities in 2000, prior to the enactment of this amendment, it did not apply to Akshardham. However certain NGOs and activists felt that the temple was constructed without obtaining the necessary environmental clearances. In January 2005, the U.P. Employees Federation presented their case before the Supreme Court of India that the temple had not obtained necessary environmental clearances and that it would be harmful to the environment. After hearing the case, the Supreme Court observed that in the construction of Akshardham, all the Land Use Plans had been adhered to and clearance of expert bodies like the Central Water Commission and the National Environment Engineering Research Institute has been obtained. Thus, the Supreme Court ruled that the Akshardham construction was lawful and did not violate environmental norms. Despite this ruling, some activists and politicians continued to assert that the Akshardham construction was illegal and posed a threat to the Yamuna River floodplains. In a 2009 ruling on a related issue, the Supreme Court further clarified that it rejected as false the assertions that Akshardham did not have environmental permissions and was harmful to the Yamuna riverbed. It reiterated its earlier 2005 Ruling that Akshardham had received all necessary environmental permissions from Central Water Commission and NEERI, which is an autonomous body, and that the Akshardham site was not located on the Yamuna "riverbed" or "floodplain", but 1700 meters away from the Yamuna River bank.

Development 
A team of eight swamis were assigned to oversee the Akshardham project. The majority of the team had gained experience from work on the Akshardham in Gandhinagar, Gujarat, Delhi Akshardham's sister complex. During development, Pramukh Swami Maharaj was consulted in many aspects of the monument's construction.

Around 1997 and 1998, the idea to start development on the temple, by beginning the stone carving, had been requested. However, Pramukh Swami Maharaj asserted that the construction should only start after the land was acquired. The initial work done on the site was on the foundation. Initially, the site wasn't considered ideal for construction. As a result, a deep foundation was imperative. To construct a stable foundation,  of rocks and sand were entwined with wire mesh and topped by five feet of concrete. Five million fired bricks raised the foundation another . These bricks were then topped by three more feet of concrete to form the main support under the monument.

On 2 July 2001, the first sculpted stone was laid. The team of eight swamis consisted of scholars in the field of the Pancharatra Shastra, a Hindu scripture on architecture and deity carving. The swamis watched over stonework as well as the research on carvings on Indian craftsmanship from between the eighth and twelfth centuries. This research was done at various sites such as Angkor Wat, as well as Jodhpur, Jagannath Puri, Konark & temples of Bhubaneswar of Odisha and other temples in South India.

Seven thousand carvers and three thousand volunteers were put to work for the construction Akshardham. With over 6,000 tons of pink sandstone coming from Rajasthan, workshop sites were set up around places within the state. Amongst the carvers were local farmers and fifteen hundred tribal women who had suffered from a drought and received economic gain due to this work. The initial stone cutting was done by machine, while the detailed carvings were done by hand. Every night, over one hundred trucks were sent to Akshardham, where four thousand workers and volunteers operated on the construction site.

Opening ceremony
Akshardham was consecrated on 6 November 2005 by Pramukh Swami Maharaj and ceremoniously dedicated to the nation by the President of India, Dr. A.P.J. Abdul Kalam,
the Prime Minister, Manmohan Singh, and the Leader of the Opposition in the Indian Parliament, Lal Krishna Advani, with the presence of 25,000 guests. After touring the central monument, president Kalam then gave a speech on where Akshardham fits within the society, and finished by saying,

Prime Minister Singh followed by hoping that this would usher in religious tolerance and praised the architecture of the complex. He made note of it becoming a future landmark of India while L. K. Advani called it "the most unique monument of the world."
Pramukh Swami Maharaj ended the night's speeches and expressed the wish that "In this Akshardham, may one and all find inspiration to mould their lives and may their lives become divine. Such is my prayer to God."

Garbhagruh renovation and other events

On 13 July 2010, a newly designed garbhagruh, or inner sanctum, was inaugurated by Pramukh Swami Maharaj in the main monument within the Akshardham complex. The new garbhagruh includes a decorated, canopied sihasan, upon which the murti of Swaminarayan rests and features intricate carvings and gold-leafed designs.

Akshardham served as a featured attraction during the 2010 Commonwealth Games held in Delhi. Through the duration of the Games, hundreds of athletes, teams, and enthusiasts from around the world visited the complex. On 14 November 2010, the Swaminarayan Research Institute at Akshardham was inaugurated through an event organised by the women's faction of the organisation, highlighting the value of seva, or socially beneficial volunteer efforts, in society through mandirs, churches, mosques, and other places of worship.

Guinness world record
On 17 December 2007, Michael Whitty, an official world record adjudicator for Guinness World Record, travelled to Ahmedabad, India to present a new world record to Pramukh Swami Maharaj, the spiritual leader of BAPS Swaminarayan Sanstha, for the Akshardham complex.

The record was presented for Akshardham as the World's Largest Comprehensive Hindu Temple (certificate).

The certificate states,

Upon presentation of the award, Michael Whitty stated, "It took us three months of research, poring over the extensive architectural plans of the Akshardham and also those of other temples of comparable size, visiting and inspecting the site, before we were convinced that Akshardham deserved the title..."

There are three temples, the Meenakshi Amman Temple in Madurai, the Sri Ranganathaswamy Temple in Srirangam, and the Annamalaiyar Temple in Thiruvannamalai, all located in Tamil Nadu, India, which claim to be larger than Akshardham. The trustees of these temples have reportedly disputed the Guinness World Record.

See also
Swaminarayan Akshardham (Gandhinagar)
Swaminarayan Akshardham (New Jersey)

References

External links

Akshardham Information
 Official Akshardham Delhi Website
 Akshardham Temple Complex on the Incredible India website
 Panoramic Virtual Tour of Akshardham
Other
 Guinness World Records – Adjudications – World's Largest Hindu Temple
 BAPS Swaminarayan Sanstha- The organisation responsible for the creation of Akshardham
 Mystic India- The film shown at Akshardham
 Akshardham Gandhinagar Website
 

Buildings and structures in Delhi
Hindu temples in Delhi
Swaminarayan temples
Religious buildings and structures completed in 2005
2005 establishments in Delhi